Razorback is a locality and scattered village in the Macarthur Region of New South Wales, Australia, in the Wollondilly Shire. It is in between the main Macarthur towns of Picton (to the south) and Camden (to the north).

It is commonly referred to as Razorback Range as it is part range of high steep hills that make up the Macarthur Region. Furthermore, like most of the Wollondilly it is part of the hills that are in between the Blue Mountains and Southern Highlands regions.

At the top of Razorback contains a lookout which offers panoramic views of the Campbelltown-Camden urban district as well as the metropolitan Sydney as a whole.

References

 

Wollondilly Shire
Main Southern railway line, New South Wales